The Grand Grimoire is a black magic grimoire. Different editions date the book to 1521, 1522 or 1421, but it was probably written during the early 19th century. Owen Davies suggests 1702 is when the first edition may have been created and a Bibliothèque bleue version (a popular edition, similar to a chapbook) of the text may have been published in 1750. The "introductory chapter" was authored by someone named Antonio Venitiana del Rabina who supposedly gathered his information from original writings of King Solomon. Much of material of this grimoire derives from the Key of Solomon and the Lesser Key of Solomon, pseudepigraphical grimoires attributed to King Solomon.  Also known as Le Dragon Rouge or The Red Dragon, this book contains instructions purported to summon Lucifer or Lucifuge Rofocale, for the purpose of forming a Deal with the Devil. The 19th century French occultist Éliphas Lévi (author of Dogme et rituel de la haute magie) claimed the contemporary edition of Le Dragon Rouge to be a counterfeit of a true, older Grand Grimoire.

The work is divided into two books. The first book contains instructions for summoning a demon and for the construction of tools with which to force the demon to do one's bidding. The second book is divided further into two parts: the Sanctum Regnum and Secrets, de L'Art Magique du Grand Grimoire ("Secrets, of the magic art of the Grand Grimoire"). The Sanctum Regnum contain instructions for making a pact with the demon, allowing one to command the spirit without the tools required by book one, but at greater risk. Secrets contains simple spells and rituals one can employ after having performed the ritual of the first book. Some editions contain a short text between these two parts, Le Secret Magique, où le Grand Art de pouvoir parler aux Morts (The Magic Secret, or the Grand Art of being able to speaking with the dead), dealing with necromancy.

The book describes several demons as well as the rituals to summon them in order to make a pact with them. It also details several spells for winning a lottery, talking to spirits, being loved by a girl, making oneself invisible, etc.

The demons
This book mentions three greater demons. These demons are similarly prioritized in Grimorium Verum.  Although, for Tarl Warwick's English translation of the work, the "demons" are referenced by the more generic term of "spirits".
 Lucifer, emperor
 Beelzebub, prince
 Astaroth, grand duke

It also mentions six lesser demons:
 Lucifuge Rofocale, prime minister
 Satanachia, commander in chief (in French, "commandant en chef", although Warwick translates it as "great general")
 Agaliarept, commandant 
 Fleurèty, lieutenant-general
 Sargatanas, brigadier-major
 Nebiros, marshal and inspector general ("camp marshal" in Warwick's translation)

In popular culture
Fantasy author Lin Carter uses the word "karcist" as a synonym for "magician" or "sorcerer" in several of his works, citing the Grand Grimoire as a source. In his novel Thongor in the City of Magicians, Carter's "karcist" is a mage requested to serve as "controller" of a magic ritual enacted by a cabal of his colleagues.

For the video game Final Fantasy Tactics Advance, the Grand Grimoire is a magical book that survived the Flood on Noah's Ark, but the value of which was forgotten. The book is found later by one of the game's main characters, Mewt Randell, in a used book shop. The book's power transports the game's protagonists to Ivalice, a fictional universe used as a setting for other Final Fantasy games as well.

For the 1989 motion picture Warlock, actor Julian Sands plays a warlock trying to find the three Grand Grimoires, which when combined purportedly contain the name of God. In the movie the book has supernatural properties, and is therefore separated into three sets of pages to prevent its evil power from being abused.

In James H. Brennan's literary series Sagas of the Demonspawn, Lucifuge Rofocale is the name of the demon incarnated in the sword named Doom Bringer. According to the Grand Grimoire, Lucifuge Rofocale is the demon in charge of Hell's government.

The Netherlands musical band God Dethroned have an album named The Grand Grimoire (1997).

In its second season, the Fox TV series Sleepy Hollow presents the Grand Grimoire as once owned by occultist John Dee and coveted by an evil warlock named Solomon Kent. It became possessed by one of the series' antagonists, Henry Parrish, and helped cause the demise of protagonist Katrina Crane.

For the 2012 video game Professor Layton vs. Phoenix Wright: Ace Attorney, a book named the Grand Grimoire contains all of the black magic within the town of Labyrinthia, and is used by Phoenix Wright to reveal contradictions and illogic of accusations of witchcraft.

The killer of Bibaa Henry and Nicole Smallman in Kingsbury, London in 2020, had invoked Lucifuge Rofocale prior to the killings. He hoped that by sacrificing their lives to the demon, he would win a lottery.

American rock music band Coven referenced the hierarchy of demons presented in the Grand Grimoire in their 1969 song "Dignitaries of Hell." The song, part of their controversial album Witchcraft Destroys Minds & Reaps Souls, has lyrics that include a brief summary of each demon's respective job in hell.

The novel God's Demon by Wayne Barlowe features most of the Grand Grimoire's named demons as characters, including Sargatanas as its protagonist.

In Dungeon Crawl Stone Soup, "Grand Grimoire" is used as the name of a spellbook containing high-level summoning spells.

See also
Grimorium Verum
Petit Albert
Grand Albert

References

Further reading
E. M. Butler, Ritual Magic, "The Solomonic Cycle", CUP Archive, 1979, 
Tarl Warwick, "The Grand Grimoire: The Red Dragon", illustrated and translated to English, second edition 2016, 
Aaman Lamba & Arundell Overman "The Complete Illustrated Grand Grimoire, Or The Red Dragon: Interlinear Edition, French to English", 
Black Letter Press, "The Red Dragon", translated to English by Paul Summers Young, first edition 2019

External links
 
 Digital edition by Joseph H. Peterson 

18th-century books
Goetia
Grimoires
Left-Hand Path